The 1973 Southeast Asian Peninsular Games, officially known as the 7th Southeast Asian Peninsular Games, was a Southeast Asian multi-sport event held in Singapore from 1 to 8 September 1973 with 16 sports featured in the games. This was the first time Singapore hosted the games. Singapore is the fourth nation to host the Southeast Asian Games after Thailand, Burma and Malaysia. The games was opened and closed by Benjamin Sheares, the President of Singapore at the Singapore National Stadium. The final medal tally was led by Thailand, followed by host Singapore and Malaysia.

The games

Participating nations

 
 
 
 
  (host)

Sports

Medal table

References

External links
 History of the SEA Games
 Medal Tally 1959-1995
 Medal Tally
 OCA SEA Games
 SEA Games previous medal table
 SEAGF Office  
 SEA Games members
 The 7th SEAP Games

Southeast Asian Games
S
S
Southeast Asian Peninsular Games, 1973
Multi-sport events in Singapore
Southeast Asian Peninsular Games